The sixth season of Homicide: Life on the Street aired in the United States on the NBC television network from October 17, 1997 to May 8, 1998 and contained 23 episodes. 

The sixth season marked the debut of character Detective Laura Ballard (Callie Thorne). Detectives Frank Pembleton (Andre Braugher) and Mike Kellerman (Reed Diamond) depart the show in the season finale. Chief Medical Examiner Julianna Cox departs mid-season, with her last appearance being in the episode "Lies and Other Truths". Detectives Paul Falsone (Jon Seda) and Stuart Gharty (Peter Gerety), both of whom appeared in the Season 5 finale, become regular characters.

The DVD box set of season 6 was released for Region 1 on January 25, 2005. The set includes all 23 season 6 episodes on six discs.

Going into the sixth season, NBC gave the series producers an ultimatum to make Homicide more popular than its CBS timeslot competitor Nash Bridges or face cancellation. When this goal was not reached, the studio began serious consideration to canceling the show, but a number of unexpected events at NBC increased Homicide's value. Among those factors were the loss of the popular series Seinfeld and the $850 million deal needed to keep ER from leaving the network. As a result, the show received a 22-episode seventh season.

Andre Braugher would go on to win the only Emmy and, in 1999, Golden Globe awards the series would ever receive.

Episodes
When first shown on network television, multiple episodes were aired out of order. The DVD present the episodes in the correct chronological order, restoring all storylines and character developments.

References

 
 
 

 
1997 American television seasons
1998 American television seasons